Ally Fashion is an Australian women's fast fashion retailer. The company commenced operation in 2001 as a wholesaler launching its first store in Macarthur Square, Sydney.  In 2002 Ally Fashion currently has 148 physical stores throughout Australia and is also focused on online fashion retail.

History
Founded in 2001, Ally Fashion have over 148 stores across Australia and an online store.

Products
Ally Fashion sells women's fashion trend items such as: Dresses, Tops, Basics, Skirts, Shorts, Denim, Outerwear and Accessories.

Stores

Ally Fashion has currently 148 stores across Darwin, Queensland, New South Wales, Australian Capital Territory, Victoria, South Australia, Western Australia and Tasmania. In December 2016 Ally Fashion announced the re-opening of their store at north Rockhampton centre. Ally Fashion online store is also available internationally with shipping available worldwide.

References

External links
 Ally Fashion Official Website

Clothing retailers of Australia